The 1988 All-Ireland Under-21 Hurling Championship was the 25th staging of the All-Ireland Under-21 Hurling Championship since its establishment by the Gaelic Athletic Association in 1964. The championship began on 8 June 1988 and ended on 11 September 1988.

Limerick entered the championship as the defending champions, however, they were beaten by Cork in the Munster final.

On 11 September 1988, Cork won the championship following a 4-11 to 1-05 defeat of Kilkenny in the All-Ireland final. This was their ninth All-Ireland title overall and their first title since 1982.

Cork's Dan O'Connelll was the championship's top scorer with 6-03.

Results

Leinster Under-21 Hurling Championship

Quarter-finals

Semi-finals

Final

Munster Under-21 Hurling Championship

Quarter-finals

Semi-finals

Final

Ulster Under-21 Hurling Championship

Semi-final

Final

All-Ireland Under-21 Hurling Championship

Semi-finals

Final

Championship statistics

Top scorers

Overall

References

Under
All-Ireland Under-21 Hurling Championship